Jason Laney (born 27 April 1973) is a former English cricketer. He was a right-handed batsman and a right-arm off-break bowler. He played for Hampshire between 1995 and 2002, and also played for Matabeleland. He had also played for Hampshire since 1991 in the Second XI Championship.

While he was used sporadically in this championship from 1991 (though he neither performed with the bat or ball during his debut), he played his debut First-class match in 1995, a draw against Northamptonshire which saw centuries from captain Robin Smith and Mark Nicholas. He participated in the County Championship for six years, though did not play regularly during Hampshire's Division Two season of 2001, and stopped playing First-class cricket a year later. During his last cricket match, against Hampshire Second XI, he was dismissed for a duck.

External links

1973 births
English cricketers
Living people
Hampshire cricketers
Matabeleland cricketers
NBC Denis Compton Award recipients
Cricketers from Winchester